Chamberlin Rampart is a series of ice-covered bluffs midway along the west slope of the Darley Hills, in the Churchill Mountains. The feature was named by the Advisory Committee on Antarctic Names after Wellman Chamberlin, a National Geographic Magazine (NGM) cartographer, from about 1935 to 1970, and author of the NGM monograph The Round Earth on Flat Paper, 1947. It is one of several features in the Darley Hills that are named for NGM staff.

References 

Cliffs of Oates Land